Buckner is a town in Lafayette County, Arkansas, United States. The population was 275 at the 2010 census.

Geography
Buckner is located at  (33.358095, -93.436689).

Demographics

As of the census of 2000, there were 396 people, 144 households, and 112 families residing in the city. The racial makeup of the city was 52.53% White, 45.20% Black or African American, 0.76% Native American, 0.51% Asian, and 1.01% from two or more races.  0.51% of the population were Hispanic or Latino of any race.

There were 144 households, out of which 31.9% had children under the age of 18 living with them, 56.9% were married couples living together, 16.7% had a female householder with no husband present, and 22.2% were non-families. 19.4% of all households were made up of individuals, and 6.9% had someone living alone who was 65 years of age or older.  The average household size was 2.75 and the average family size was 3.13.

In the city the population was spread out, with 25.3% under the age of 18, 9.1% from 18 to 24, 28.5% from 25 to 44, 23.5% from 45 to 64, and 13.6% who were 65 years of age or older.  The median age was 38 years. For every 100 females, there were 111.8 males.  For every 100 females age 18 and over, there were 96.0 males.

The median income for a household in the city was $24,063, and the median income for a family was $25,179. The per capita income for the city was $10,192.  About 19.1% of families and 25.8% of the population were below the poverty line, including 43.5% of those under age 18 and 21.7% of those age 65 or over.

Climate
The climate in this area is characterized by hot, humid summers and generally mild to cool winters.  According to the Köppen Climate Classification system, Buckner has a humid subtropical climate, abbreviated "Cfa" on climate maps.

Infrastructure
  U.S. Highway 82
  Arkansas Highway 53

References

External links
Encyclopedia of Arkansas History & Culture entry

Towns in Arkansas
Towns in Lafayette County, Arkansas